Saint George Kyparissiotes, is a ruined Byzantine-era monastery near modern Tirilye in Bursa Province, Turkey (medieval Trigleia in Bithynia).

It was built in 956.

References

Byzantine church buildings in Turkey
Byzantine Bithynia
Greek Orthodox monasteries in Turkey
Buildings and structures in Bursa Province
10th-century establishments in the Byzantine Empire